HMS Birmingham was a Type 42 destroyer laid down by Cammell Laird and Company, Limited, at Birkenhead on 28 March 1972, launched on 30 July 1973 by Lady Empson, wife of Sir Derek Empson and commissioned on 3 December 1976. She was named for the city of Birmingham, England.

Birmingham was also one of the first ships together with Ardent that served in the Persian Gulf on the Armilla patrol that protected oil supplies during the Iran–Iraq War in 1980. She was also the first ship to replenish a Sea Dart missile at sea.
Birmingham spent much of her service as Fleet Contingency Ship and spent considerable time in the post-Falklands conflict patrol role. In 1985 she took part in Standing Naval Force Mediterranean, calling at Gibraltar, Palma de Mallorca, Naples, & Messina. After a refit at Rosyth dockyard, she returned to Portsmouth in 1988 for sea trials and re-acceptance to the fleet. Commanded by Roy Clare, Director of the Maritime Museum in London (2006-7), her first deployment post-refit was a tour to the Persian Gulf region, returning in March 1989.

In July 1990, whilst on deployment as part of the West Indies Guard Ship, Birmingham, supported by RFA Oakleaf was ordered to sail from Florida to Trinidad in response to the Jamaat al Muslimeen coup attempt, in which Islamist fundamentalists had taken hostages. However, as the Birmingham arrived the hostages were released. 
 
Birmingham paid off at Portsmouth on 10 December 1999. In early January 2000 under her own power, she sailed to Devonport where, for the next two months, she was stripped of usable equipment. In May 2000 she was towed back to Portsmouth where she was sold for scrap,  leaving under tow for Spain on 20 October 2000.

References

 

Cold War destroyers of the United Kingdom
History of Birmingham, West Midlands
Ships built on the River Mersey
1973 ships
Type 42 destroyers of the Royal Navy